Felcra Berhad is a corporate organisation wholly owned by the Malaysian Government, under the Minister of Finance (Incorporated).

Felcra Berhad was started off and initially established as a statutory body in 1966 with the name Federal Land Consolidation and Rehabilitation Authority (Felcra), with the objective to develop rural areas by helping the rural community to join in economic activities and to improve their living standards. Its goal is to create a dynamic, attractive and profitable rural sector.

It became a company in 1997, and was as of October 2018 reported to be managing 220,086 hectares of plantation and farmland of 111,684 Felcra settlers and their families, and 30,189 hectares of Felcra's own land.

Subsidiaries

Owned
 Felcra Plantation Services Sdn Bhd
 Felcra Agro Industry Sdn Bhd
 Felcra Urus Estet Sdn Bhd
 Felcra Cambodia Private Limited
 Felcra Processing & Engineering Sdn Bhd
 Felcra Bina Sdn Bhd
 Felcra Properties Sdn Bhd
 Felcra Training & Consultancy Sdn Bhd
 Felcra Education Services Sdn Bhd
 Felcra Niaga Sdn Bhd
 Felcra Bekalan & Perkhidmatan Sdn Bhd
 Felcra Livestock & Agri Product Sdn Bhd
 Yayasan Felcra
 Permodalan Felcra Sdn Bhd

Joint Venture
 Felcra Daya Khas Plantation Sdn Bhd
 Felcra Balingian Plantation Sdn Bhd
 Felcra Ever Herald Sdn Bhd
 Felcra Gedong Plantation Sdn Bhd
 Felcra Sundar Awat-Awat Plantation Sdn Bhd
 Felcra Pelita Jemoreng Sdn Bhd

Allied
 Felcra Jaya Putra Sdn Bhd
 Sinergi Perdana Sdn Bhd
 Felcra Jaya Mukah Sdn Bhd
 Felcra Jaya Samarahan Sdn Bhd

References

External links

Government-owned companies of Malaysia
Minister of Finance (Incorporated) (Malaysia)
Companies established in 1997
1997 establishments in Malaysia
Ministry of Rural Development (Malaysia)
Privately held companies of Malaysia